You Hockry  (born 20 August 1944) is a Cambodian politician. He belongs to the Funcinpec party and was elected to represent Kampong Cham in the National Assembly of Cambodia in 2003.

He once served as the secretary-general of the Norodom Ranariddh Party.

References

1944 births
Living people
FUNCINPEC politicians
Norodom Ranariddh Party politicians
Members of the National Assembly (Cambodia)
Howard University alumni
Royal University of Law and Economics alumni 
People from Kampong Cham province